Reiff's Gas Station Museum  is a museum of American car memorabilia in Woodland, California. It was founded in 2000.

The museum collection includes antique gas pumps,  an antique gas station, a 1956 Chevrolet tow truck, a diner, a general store, a movie theater, a car crash, an airplane crash, vintage gas station signs and logos .

The museum started in the residence of Mark Reiff.  It now covers 10,000 square feet (900 m2) of exhibit space. A meeting room of 650 square feet (60 m2) and an outdoor patio of 900 square feet (84 m2) .

The museum also provides photo shoot locations.  Owners can bring their vintage cars to be photographed in the antique scenes within the museum.  The museum hosts the annual Reiff's Street Bash in June.

References

External links
 Reiff's Antique Gas Station and 1950s Automotive Museum
 One man’s love affair with old gas pumps evokes years gone by - Daily Republic Newspaper 01june2011
 He gets his kicks out of fake Route 66 - San Diego Union-Tribune Newspaper 21june2009
 Living in the Past - RoadKing Magazine 01jan2009

Buildings and structures in Woodland, California
Automobile museums in California
Transportation museums in California
History museums in California
Museums in Yolo County, California